The Abbotsford Canucks are a professional ice hockey team based in Abbotsford, British Columbia, and members of the American Hockey League (AHL). The team began play in the 2021–22 season with home games at Abbotsford Centre as the AHL affiliate of the National Hockey League's Vancouver Canucks. The team is a relocation of the franchise owned by the Canucks and known as the Utica Comets from 2013 to 2021. This is the second AHL team to play in Abbotsford after the Calgary Flames affiliate Abbotsford Heat from 2009 until 2014.

History
The Abbotsford Canucks franchise is one of the oldest professional hockey franchises in existence, dating back to 1932, when the team was known as the Quebec Beavers. In 1935, the franchise moved to Springfield and became the Indians, reviving the name after the original Indians franchise ceased operations during the 1932–33 Canadian-American Hockey League season. In addition to the Indians, the team has been known as the Syracuse Warriors, Springfield Kings, Worcester IceCats, Peoria Rivermen, and Utica Comets.

On March 29, 2013, Canucks Sports & Entertainment (CS&E), owners of the National Hockey League's (NHL) Vancouver Canucks, was announced as purchasing the American Hockey League (AHL) franchise then playing as the Peoria Rivermen. The purchase was approved by the league on April 18. After purchasing the franchise, CS&E intended to have the franchise located in a market close to Vancouver with their initial preference as Abbotsford, which at the time was home to the Calgary Flames AHL farm club, the Abbotsford Heat. The Heat had been rumored to relocate to Utica, New York, at the time. Negotiations between the Canucks and Abbotsford broke down by April 22 and the Heat remained in the city.

After exploring options for having the team in Vancouver, Seattle, and Peoria, CS&E came to a six-year operating agreement with Robert Esche to place the franchise in Utica and the city's soon-to-be-renovated Memorial Auditorium as the Utica Comets. The Comets began play in the 2013–14 AHL season. The Heat lasted only one more season in Abbotsford before relocating to Glens Falls, New York, as the Adirondack Flames in 2014. Before the 2019–20 season, CS&E and Esche's operating contract was extended for up to an additional six years, with potential opt outs every two seasons.

In April 2021, a new trademark was filed for the brand "Utica Devils" by Robert Esche for a potential relocation of the Binghamton Devils. On May 4, the Canucks announced that they planned to relocate the Comets' franchise to Abbotsford, pending final discussions with the city of Abbotsford and league approval, for the 2021–22 season. On May 6, the league approved both the relocations of the Canucks owned Comets franchise to Abbotsford and the Devils franchise to Utica with the Utica team remaining branded as the Comets. The Canucks and the city of Abbotsford signed a five-year agreement on June 29 to host the team, with options for further renewal that could extend the deal for as long as twenty years.

On July 14, the name, logo, and colours were released. The Vancouver Canucks transferred both former Comets general manager Ryan Johnson and head coach Trent Cull to Abbotsford.

Season-by-season records

Players

Current roster
Updated March 15, 2023.

Team captains 

 Chase Wouters, 2022–present

References

External links
 

 
Ice hockey clubs established in 2021
2021 establishments in British Columbia